Karen Patricia Buck (born 30 August 1958) is a British politician serving as Member of Parliament (MP) for Westminster North, previously Regent's Park and Kensington North, since 1997. A member of the Labour Party, she was Parliamentary Under-Secretary of State for Transport from 2005 to 2006 and has served as Shadow Minister for Social Security since 2020.

Early life
Born in Castlederg, County Tyrone, Northern Ireland, Buck was educated at the Chelmsford County High School for Girls and the London School of Economics, from where she was awarded a BSc and an MSc in Economics, and an MA in Social Policy and Administration. Buck was briefly a Young Liberal.

She joined the Labour Party in 1978. The following year, she became a research and development worker with Outset, a charity working with disabled people, before joining Hackney London Borough Council in 1983, initially working for them as a senior disability officer, and from 1986 as a public health officer.

Buck first ran for election in 1982, aged 23, as one of the three unsuccessful Labour candidates in Barnet's Mill Hill ward. In 1986 she stood in Westminster City Council's Cavendish ward, an area straddling Marylebone and the West End of London. Despite the large increase in the Labour vote, all three seats were narrowly retained by the Conservatives, in a tightly contested election which saw Labour come close to winning the council.

She began working for the Labour Party in 1987 as a health directorate researcher, becoming a campaign strategy coordinator in 1992. She was elected to Westminster City Council in 1990, representing Queen's Park ward (situated around the area of that name) in a safe seat for her party. Buck remained on the council until shortly after her election to parliament in 1997, when she stood down. Whilst a councillor, she was involved in exposing the fraudulent behaviour of council leader Shirley Porter and the homes for votes scandal.

Parliamentary career
Buck was selected to stand for election for Labour through an all-women shortlist. The seat was based largely on the former Westminster North constituency, which was held narrowly by the former Conservative minister John Wheeler. Wheeler retired, and Buck was elected at the 1997 general election as the Labour MP for Regent's Park and Kensington North as part of the Labour landslide, with a majority of 14,657. She made her maiden speech on 17 June 1997, and has remained an MP since this time. In a 2005 profile, she was described as "A bright and humorous centre-left feminist" who "has the perfect New Labour pedigree."

Following her election to Parliament, Buck joined the Social Security Select committee, and after the 2001 general election she joined the Work and Pensions Select Committee. In 2001, her appointment as an Assistant Government Whip was announced without her knowledge and consent. She declined to take up the post. However, she did become a member of Prime Minister Tony Blair's government in the wake of the 2005 general election, as the Parliamentary Under Secretary of State at the Department for Transport.

At the 2010 general election she was elected MP for the newly recreated marginal seat of Westminster North, with a majority of 2,126 over Joanne Cash, the Conservative candidate, in a high-profile race.

In the Labour leadership contest which resulted from Gordon Brown's resignation as party leader, and Labour going into opposition, Buck nominated Ed Miliband to replace him. Following Miliband's election as Leader of the Labour Party, Buck was made Shadow Minister for Work and Pensions, and then Shadow Minister for Education, before becoming his Parliamentary Private Secretary. In July 2015, she was elected as a member of the Work and Pensions Select Committee.

Following Labour's defeat at the 2015 election, which saw Buck re-elected with a slightly decreased majority, Miliband resigned as leader. Buck nominated Yvette Cooper in the resulting leadership election. Cooper came third, with Jeremy Corbyn becoming party leader; Buck did not serve in any posts during his leadership. In the 2016 Labour leadership election, when Corbyn was challenged by Owen Smith, Buck nominated Smith. At the 2017 general election, Buck increased her majority by 14.7%, from 1,977 (5.0%) to 11,512 (26.6%), representing a 10.8% swing to Labour in the constituency.

In December 2018, Buck's Private Member's Bill received Royal Assent as the Homes (Fitness for Human Habitation) Act, coming into force on 20 March 2019. If a landlord failed to let and maintain a property that was fit for human habitation, the Bill would give tenants the right to take action in the courts. The Bill received cross-party support. She was re-elected in 2019, with a small swing away from Labour, again with a substantial majority of 10,759 (25.07%), suggesting that Westminster North is now a safe seat. Nationally, Labour were defeated for the fourth time in a row, and a leadership election was held in 2020 to replace Corbyn. Buck nominated Keir Starmer, who won and consequently became party leader. In July 2020, she was made a Shadow Minister for Social Security.

Views
Buck expressed concerned in 2018 that homeless Londoners were forced to move out of London, stating: "Losing your home is a deeply traumatic event and then being offered accommodation miles away from your community, your work, your children's school and your care responsibilities compounds all that trauma. People are struggling against the most appalling odds to hold their own lives together and above all to hold their kids' lives together."

She has voted in favour of the hunting ban and gay marriage, whilst in 2007, she voted against replacing Trident. Buck was previously a member of the Campaign for Nuclear Disarmament. Whilst an MP, she has been in Greenpeace and Amnesty International.

Buck was formerly a member of two white-collar public service trade unions, the Association of Scientific, Technical and Managerial Staffs (ASTMS) and the National and Local Government Officers' Association (NALGO). Prior to it being merged with Amicus, she was a member of the Transport and General Workers' Union (TGWU).

Personal life
Buck is married to Barrie Taylor, a former Labour councillor in Westminster who was conferred with the title of Honorary Alderman in July 2018. From 1994 to 1997, Buck and Taylor served together as councillors for Queen's Park ward in Westminster. The couple have a son, Cosmo.

Buck is a Roman Catholic.

References

External links

 
 Guardian Unlimited Politics – Ask Aristotle: Karen Buck MP
 CNN.com video segment on Buck's 2010 reelection campaign
 

|-

1958 births
Living people
People from Castlederg
Labour Party (UK) MPs for English constituencies
Alumni of the London School of Economics
Councillors in the City of Westminster
Female members of the Parliament of the United Kingdom for English constituencies
UK MPs 1997–2001
UK MPs 2001–2005
UK MPs 2005–2010
UK MPs 2010–2015
UK MPs 2015–2017
UK MPs 2017–2019
UK MPs 2019–present
Labour Party (UK) councillors
People educated at Chelmsford County High School for Girls
Politicians from County Tyrone
20th-century British women politicians
21st-century British women politicians
20th-century women from Northern Ireland
20th-century people from Northern Ireland
21st-century women from Northern Ireland
21st-century people from Northern Ireland
Women councillors in England